The Rodovia Fernão Dias (official designation BR-381 or SP-010 in the state of São Paulo) is a federal highway which runs in the Brazilian states of São Paulo and southern region of Minas Gerais. In Atibaia, the Fernão Dias highway intersects the Dom Pedro I highway, which runs from Campinas to Jacareí.

The highway is thus named in honour of Fernão Dias Paes Leme, a Brazilian explorer and "bandeirante" of the 17th century. It is 562.1 km long. It was fully duplicated in 2002.

Major cities cut by the BR-381

São Paulo 

 São Paulo
 Guarulhos
 Mairiporã
 Atibaia
 Bragança Paulista
 Vargem

Minas Gerais

 Belo Horizonte
 Betim
 Camanducaia
 Carmo da Cachoeira
 Contagem
 Igarapé
 Itapeva
 Nepomuceno
 Carmopolis de Minas
 Oliveira
 Pouso Alegre
 Santo Antônio do Amparo
 São Joaquim de Bicas
 Três Corações
 João Monlevade
 Vale do Aço (Metropolitan area)
 Extrema
 Governador Valadares

Location of the toll plazas

São Paulo 

 Km 017 - Mairiporã
 Km 007 - Vargem

Minas Gerais 

 Km 902 - Cambuí
 Km 804 - São Gonçalo do Sapucaí
 Km 733 - Carmo da Cachoeira
 Km 659 - Santo Antonio do Amparo
 Km 596 - Carmópolis de Minas
 Km 546 - Itatiaiuçu

Note: All squares are bidirectional.

See also
 Brazilian Highway System
 Highway system of São Paulo

References

External links
 BR-381. Ministry of Transportation.

Federal highways in Brazil
Highways in São Paulo (state)